Cloniocerini is a tribe of longhorn beetles of the subfamily Lamiinae. It was described by Lacordaire in 1872. It contains the single genus Cloniocerus, and the following species:

 Cloniocerus albosticticus Breuning, 1940
 Cloniocerus bohemanni White, 1855
 Cloniocerus constrictus Fahraeus, 1872
 Cloniocerus hystrix (Fabricius, 1781)
 Cloniocerus kraussii White, 1855
 Cloniocerus lamellicornis Breuning, 1950
 Cloniocerus ochripennis Breuning, 1940

References

Lamiinae
Cerambycidae genera